Oak Cliff is an area of numerous communities and neighborhoods in Dallas, Texas, United States. Encompassing roughly 1/5 of Dallas, Oak Cliff was a separate city in Dallas County until Dallas annexed it in 1901. The area contains some of Dallas' oldest historic districts and most established neighborhoods. 

The boundaries of Oak Cliff are roughly Interstate 30 on the north, Loop 12 on the west, Interstate 35 on the east, the Trinity River on the northeast and Interstate 20 on the south.

History 
The farm was subdivided into  blocks, and the plat of the new town made. Armstrong and Marsalis began to develop the land into an elite residential area, which proved to be a success by the end of 1887, with sales surpassing $60,000. However, after a disagreement between the partners, Marsalis secured complete control over Oak Cliff's development. Armstrong would go on to create his own elite residential development on the north side of Dallas, known as Highland Park.

According to the first plat filed, the original township of Oak Cliff extended as far north as First Street, later named Brazos Street, one block north of Lake Cliff, then known as Spring Lake, and as far south as a pavilion below Thirteenth Street. It was bounded on the east by Miller Avenue, later named Denley Drive, and on the west by Beckley Avenue. Jefferson Boulevard was the route of a steam railroad, and the principal north and south thoroughfare was Marsalis Avenue, then called Grand Street.

On November 1, 1887, $23,000 worth of lots were sold in the newly opened Marsalis Addition (Oak Cliff) before noon, and on the following day, ninety-one lots were sold for $38,113. Figures published later in November gave the new suburb a population of 500. Marsalis developed the Oak Cliff Elevated Railway to provide the first transportation link to his new development, using a small shuttle train pulled by a "dummy" engine. The transportation system was modeled on one in the city of New York and was promoted as "the first elevated railway in the South". The railroad ran special trains to Oak Cliff Park the home ground of the Dallas Hams. In reality, the railroad operated at ground level almost its entire course down Jefferson Boulevard and towards Lake Cliff; it only became slightly elevated as it crossed the Trinity River. This steam railway was continued for many years for commuters and pleasure seekers. Marsalis began two other development projects with the intent to promote Oak Cliff as a vacation resort. One was Oak Cliff Park, later called Marsalis Park and Zoo, a  park that included a two-mile (3 km)-long lake and a 2,000-seat pavilion in which dances and operas were held. Another was the Park Hotel, modeled after the Hotel del Coronado in San Diego, which included several mineral baths fed by artesian wells.

Oak Cliff incorporated in 1890 with a population of 2,470, and secured a post office which operated until 1896. The community had four grocery stores, two meat markets, a hardware store, and a feed store. Businesses included the Texas Paper Mills Company (later Fleming and Sons), the Oak Cliff Planing Mill, the Oak Cliff Artesian Well Company, Patton's Medicinal Laboratories, and the Oak Cliff Ice and Refrigeration Company. A number of new elite residential areas developed by the Dallas Land and Loan Company had pushed the community's boundaries westward to Willomet Street. Oak Cliff's first mayor was Hugh Ewing. In 1891 the community's first newspaper, the Oak Cliff Sunday Weekly, was published by F. N. Oliver.

Over the next three years Oak Cliff's development continued, but, during the depression of 1893, the demand for vacation resorts decreased, and the community's growth stagnated, forcing Marsalis into bankruptcy. Consequently, the Park Hotel was converted into the Oak Cliff College for Young Ladies. Another educational institution, the Patton Seminary, was established two years later by Dr. Edward G. Patton. By 1900 Oak Cliff was already no longer an elite residential and vacation community. Many of the lots once owned by the Dallas Land and Loan Company were subdivided by the Dallas and Oak Cliff Real Estate Company and sold to the middle and working classes, a trend which lasted well into the early 1900s. The census of 1900 reported Oak Cliff's population as 3,640.

In 1902, an interurban electric streetcar line controlled by the Northern Texas Traction Company, was constructed passing through Oak Cliff, and connected Dallas to Fort Worth. This line discontinued service in the late 1930s. Known as a streetcar suburb, Oak Cliff's characteristic twists and turns are largely due to the area's topography, and the paths and turnabouts created by the streetcar service. Residential streetcar service ended in January 1956.

Oak Cliff was annexed by Dallas in 1903, after numerous attempts beginning in 1900. The proposal had met with little success, until the community's depressed economy produced a vote in favor of annexation by eighteen votes.

Ku Klux Klan (1920s)
In April 1921, the Ku Klux Klan declared a chapter within Dallas, making themselves known by not only beating and branding a local black hotel elevator operator, but by also parading in downtown Dallas with nearly 800 hooded Klansmen in attendance. The Dallas chapter is known as “Klavern 66” moved its meeting hall into Oak Cliff due to a large increase in members shortly after being announced. Klavern 66 was able to spread their influence by producing their own newspaper, Texas 100% American, which was projected to circulate approximately 18,000 copies. In March 1922, another well-known Ku Klux Klan beating in occurred, this time in Oak Cliff, against a tailor named W.J Gilbert, as reported by the Fort Worth Star-Telegram

Residential segregation (1930s to 1953)
The Great Depression caused Dallas’ economy to suffer, resulting in the Oak Cliff's black community contributing to approximately one-half of the city's unemployment population. As blacks were known to be considered first for layoffs, a need for low-income housing quickly rose. As a result, 86% of Oak Cliff's black population was forced into inhabiting sub-standard housing, commonly located on what was considered as the most undesirable and unlivable parts of Dallas. Violence broke out in Oak Cliff between its black and white citizens over the issue at hand. The Dallas mayor at the time, Woodall Rodgers, was documented as criticizing Oak Cliff's black community for inciting the violence and not being accepting of their residential segregation.

In 1952, the production and advertising company Keitz & Herndon was founded in Oak Cliff.

School desegregation (starting in 1954)
In apprehension to the Brown vs. Board of Education Supreme Court ruling in 1954, the city of Dallas resisted desegregating their schools with the help of federal judges such as Judge William H. Atwell, the Chief Judge of the United States District Court for the Northern District of Texas. To combat the inevitability of desegregation of schools, Dallas, in 1961, initiated a "Stairstep Plan". The proposed plan stated that all DISD schools would begin desegregation one grade level per year, beginning with the first grade. DISD declared all of their schools desegregated in 1967, which was later found to be inherently false. In July 1971, it was discovered that out of the total 180 DISD schools, 159 schools met the criteria to be classified as a one-race school (90% of the student population being either Black, Mexican American or Anglo). At the conclusion of the case in August 1971, Judge William M. Taylor of the United States District Court for the Northern District of Texas, ruled in favor of a majority-to-minority transfer program. The program stated that all DISD students who attended schools where their race made up the majority of the student population would integrate into schools where their race was a minority by offering free transportation by bus. For the next few decades Oak Cliff schools, along with those in South Dallas, became the focus of a long-running and bitter court battle over desegregation, one overseen by federal judge Barefoot Sanders. All of DISD's schools were officially declared desegregated by the city in 2003.

Natural disasters 
The only bridge remaining that connected Oak Cliff with Dallas after the flood was the Zang Boulevard Turnpike, an earthen fill with a single steel span across the river channel, slightly to the north of the present Houston Street Viaduct. About this time, George B. Dealey, publisher of the Morning News, returned from a trip to Kansas City with the idea of securing for Dallas an intracity causeway similar to the one there. From his proposal sprang the Houston Street Viaduct (originally named the Oak Cliff Viaduct), begun October 24, 1910, and opened to traffic February 22, 1912, acclaimed as the longest concrete bridge in the world. This latter designation was later disputed as a publicity stunt.

In 1909, a disastrous fire occurred in Oak Cliff, consuming fourteen blocks of residences, including the Briggs Sanitorium.

On April 2, 1957, a tornado ripped through Oak Cliff as part of the Early-April 1957 tornado outbreak sequence, killing 10 people and causing more than $1 million in damages.

Conservation districts 

The North Oak Cliff area has one of the highest concentrations of conservation districts in Dallas, preserving the area's history and architectural integrity. Among the 18 conservation districts in Dallas, 6 of them are in North Oak Cliff, including King's Highway, Lake Cliff South, Bishop/8th, North Cliff, Kessler Park, and Stevens Park.

Neighborhoods

North Oak Cliff
Bishop Arts District
East Kessler Park
Kessler Park
Kessler Plaza
Kidd Springs
Kings Highway Conservation District
Lake Cliff
L.O. Daniel
Stevens Park Estates
West Kessler
Winnetka Heights

Central Oak Cliff
Elmwood
Hampton Hills
Wynnewood
Wynnewood North

West Oak Cliff
Arcadia Park
El Tivoli Place
Stevens Park Village

South Oak Cliff
Five Mile Creek	
Polk Terrace
Redbird
Western Park
Wolf Creek

In addition, the Oak Cliff area encompasses Cockrell Hill, a separate municipality which is an enclave of Dallas.

Transportation

Light rail 
 DART
 Dallas Zoo Station
 Tyler/Vernon Station
 Hampton Station
 Westmoreland Station

Streetcar 
The Dallas Streetcar is a  modern-streetcar line connecting Oak Cliff with downtown Dallas.  It opened in April 2015, and extensions are planned.

Highways 
 Interstate 30
 Interstate 35E
 U.S. Highway 67

Education

Public 
The Dallas Independent School District operates district public schools.

Zoned high schools within the Oak Cliff area:
 W.H. Adamson High School - 4A - Western (The replacement campus opened in 2012)
 Sunset High School - 5A
 Franklin D. Roosevelt High School - 4A - eastern
 South Oak Cliff High School - 5A - southern
 David W. Carter High School - 5A
 Justin F. Kimball High School - 4A
 Moisés E. Molina High School - 5A
 A.W Brown Fellowship Leadership Academy Charter School
Optional high schools within the Oak Cliff area:
 New Tech High School 
Barack Obama Male Leadership Academy (all male)
 Yvonne A. Ewell Townview Magnet Center

In 2011 the district closed Maynard Jackson Middle School. Prior to summer 2011 the community often complained about poor conditions at the school. DISD rezoned the students to Kennedy Curry Middle School in southern Dallas.

Zan Wesley Holmes Jr. Middle School, which opened in 2012, is in Oak Cliff.

Rosemont Elementary School is located in North Oak Cliff. In 2015 of The Dallas Morning News wrote that it had "strong academics, passionate students and devoted parents" and that it "is considered a neighborhood gem in North Oak Cliff". The parents stated that principal Anna Brining had worked to make the school strong; in 2015 DISD notified Brining that her contract will not be renewed.

In addition, Life School, a state charter school operator, has the K-12 Oak Cliff campus.

Private 

Bishop Dunne Catholic School - TAPPS
The Kessler School
Mount St. Michael Catholic School
St. Elizabeth of Hungary Catholic School
St Cecilia's School
Tyler Street Christian Academy - TAPPS

In popular culture 
Oak Cliff is the home of the Texas Theatre, located in West Jefferson Boulevard, where former resident Lee Harvey Oswald, the man suspected of killing U.S. President John F. Kennedy and shooting Dallas Police officer JD Tippit at 10th and Patton Streets, was arrested. The theater has appeared in many books and movies on the Kennedy assassination, including Oliver Stone's 1991 film, JFK. On November 22, 1963, Warren "Butch" Burroughs, who ran the concession stand at the theatre, said that Oswald came into the theater between 1:00 and 1:07 pm; he also claimed he sold Oswald popcorn at 1:15 p.m. Julia Postal later said that Burroughs initially told her the same thing although he later denied this. Theatre patron, Jack Davis, also corroborated Burroughs' time, claiming he observed Oswald in the theatre prior to 1:20 pm.

Oak Cliff is home to the Sour Grapes art collective, founded by Carlos Donjuan, with his brothers Arturo and Miguel in 2000. The collective has murals throughout the Dallas area.

Oak Cliff is the setting of City Limit, the novel by Lantzee Miller is a coming-of-age story and metaphorical portrait of the beginning of Oak Cliff's recent rebirth and self redefinition.

Legendary Dallas radio station KLIF (the call letters survive today on different frequencies on both AM and FM) was named after Oak Cliff, the community the station was originally licensed to cover when it was founded in 1947.

Notable residents
 Albert Black - businessman
B. W. Stevenson - singer
Bryan Trubey, FAIA - architect
Dennis Rodman - former NBA Player and Naismith Memorial Basketball Hall of Fame inductee
Edie Brickell - singer-songwriter 
George Sergeant - attorney and former mayor of Dallas
George Sprague - businessman and former mayor of Dallas
Jimmie Vaughan - guitarist
Leslie Stemmons - businessman
Michael Martin Murphey - singer-songwriter
Omar Gonzalez - soccer player
Ray Wylie Hubbard - singer-songwriter
Stephen Tobolowsky - actor
Stevie Ray Vaughan  - musician
T-Bone Walker - musician 
Yvonne Craig - actress

References

Further reading
 
  Updated July 12, 2013.

External links

 
 Map of North Oak Cliff Neighborhoods

Former cities in Texas
Populated places established in 1886